John Edward "Bing" Miller (December 6, 1903 – October 12, 1964) was an American football player. He played college football for New York University and in the National Football League (NFL) as a tackle for the Staten Island Stapletons during the 1929, 1930 and 1931 seasons. He appeared in 29 NFL games, 26 as a starter.

References

1903 births
1964 deaths
Staten Island Stapletons players
Players of American football from Syracuse, New York
NYU Violets football players
American football tackles